Parliamentary elections were held in Czechoslovakia on 18 and 25 April 1920. Members of the Chamber of Deputies were elected on 18 April and members of the Senate on 25 April. The elections had initially been planned for mid- or late 1919, but had been postponed.

Results

Chamber of Deputies

Senate

Aftermath
Out of the 300 Chamber of Deputies seats 281 were filled, as no elections were held in Hlučín Region (part of the Moravská Ostrava electoral district, resulting in 1 less deputy elected from that district), the Těšín electoral district (9 deputies) and the Užhorod electoral district (9 deputies). 16 parties won parliamentary representation. Voter turnout was 89.6% for the Chamber election and 75.6% for the Senate.

The Czechoslovak Social Democratic Workers' Party (ČSDSD) emerged as the largest party in the 1920 election, with 25.7% of the vote for the Chamber of Deputies, 74 deputies elected, 28.1% of the vote for the Senate and 41 senators elected. Amongst the Czech voters, the 1920 election outcome was marked by remarkable stability compared to the 1911 election. The gap between Czech socialist and bourgeois parties had only moved by 0.4% compared to the 1911 result.

See also
List of members of the National Assembly of Czechoslovakia (1920–1925)

References

Czechoslovakia
Parliamentary election
Legislative elections in Czechoslovakia
Czechoslovakia
Catgeory:Election and referendum articles with incomplete results